The Governor of Cherkasy Oblast is the head of executive branch for the Cherkasy Oblast.

The office of Governor is an appointed position, with officeholders being appointed by the President of Ukraine, on recommendation from the Prime Minister of Ukraine.

The official residence for the Governor is located in Cherkasy. The Governor is Ihor Taburets was appointed on 2 March 2022 by President Volodymyr Zelenskyy. Taburets was appointed on the seventh day of the 2022 Russian invasion of Ukraine.

Governors

Representative of the President
 1992 – 1994 Kostiantyn Yastrub
 1994 – 1994 Vasyl Tsybenko

Chairman of the Executive Committee
 1994 – 1995 Vasyl Tsybenko

Heads of the Administration
 1995 – 1998 Vasyl Tsybenko
 1998 – 1999 Anatoliy Danylenko
 1999 – 2002 Volodymyr Lukyanets
 2002 – 2005 Vadym Lyoshenko
 2005 – 2010 Oleksandr Cherevko
 2010 – 2010 Petro Haman (acting)
 2010 – 2014 Serhiy Tulub
 2014 – 2018 Yuriy Tkachenko
 2018 – 2019 Oleksandr Velbivets
 2019 – 2019 Taras Vysotsky (acting)
 2019 – 2019 Ihor Shevchenko
 2019 – 2020 Roman Bodnar
 2020 Serhiy Serhiychuk
 2020 Viktor Husak (acting)
 2020 – 2022 Oleksandr Skichko
 2 March 2022 – present Ihor Taburets

See also
 Cherkasy Oblast Council

References

External links
Government of Cherkasy Oblast in Ukrainian
Cherkasy at the World Statesmen.org

 
Cherkasy Oblast